Richard Johannes Jomshof, né Lohikoski, (born 6 July 1969 in Helsingborg) is a Swedish politician affiliated with the Sweden Democrats (SD) party and former pop musician. He serves as party secretary of the Sweden Democrats and has been a Member of the Riksdag since September 2010 and in 2022 was appointed as chairman of the Justice Committee in the Riksdag.

Biography 
Jomshof was born in 1969 in Helsingborg to a Swedish mother and a Finnish father. He studied history and social studies at Malmö University before attending the university's affiliated teacher training college. As a teacher, Jomshof was dismissed from two jobs for being part of Sweden Democrats.

After leaving university, Jomshof became a professional musician, co-founding and playing in the Swedish synthpop band Elegant Machinery. In a 2013 interview with Side-Line, he spoke about his involvement in SD and what effect it has had on Elegant Machinery. When asked what he thought had improved in Sweden the latest 20 years, he said it was the music.

Political career 
Jomshof's original political background was in the Moderate Youth League and he had also previously voted for the Swedish Social Democratic Party. He first became active in SD in the late 1990s. During the 2009 European Parliament election, Jomshof stood on the SD's list 
but was not elected. 
Since the 2010 Swedish general election, Jomshof represents the Gävleborg constituency in the Riksdag. He was also responsible for drafting the SD's education policies in the party manifesto ahead of the 2010 election.

In 2012, he succeeded Kent Ekeroth as SD's spokesman on legal affairs, and in January 2015 he was elected as party secretary, succeeding Björn Söder. In 2021, he was appointed the SD's spokesman on education policy.

Following the 2022 Swedish general election, Jomshof was appointed chairman of the Justice Committee in the Riksdag.

Political beliefs 
Jomshof has served as the SD's policy spokesman on school policies. He has called for teachers to take on non-pedagogical tasks while increasing the number of nurses and mental health councilors working with schools. He also believes Swedish should remain the official language within the state school system. Jomshof also said that he previously was a political liberal and that much of his current beliefs and decision to join the SD were formed after working in Swedish schools in the late 1980s and stating that he was already witnessing issues surrounding discipline, language and cultural segregation between immigrants and Swedes.

Jomshof has called for a more restrictive immigration policy. He has received media attention for his statements about Islam and Muslim immigration to Sweden and has been accused of Islamophobia by political opponents, but has claimed he is not opposed to immigrants. During a speech in the Swedish parliament in 2013, Jomshof said that Islam, unlike Christianity, is immoral and violent. During the same speech he compared Islam to Nazism and claimed that they both have no place in Western society.

In 2021, Jomshof appeared on a Swedish TV show Sverige möts, where he allegedly called Islam a "disgusting religion." His remarks drew media attention and he was subsequently criticized by Moderate leader Ulf Kristersson and former Swedish prime minister Stefan Löfven. Jomshof later stated that his comments had been misinterpreted and taken out of context.

References

Sources
 BBC news with Jomshof's comments on how a member of the Swedish government shut down the SD Courier web site
 Elegant Machinery band members biography at elegantmachinery.de
 Article in Swedish newspaper Sydsvenskan about Jomshof losing his work because of his political views

Living people
1969 births
People from Helsingborg
Swedish anti-communists
Members of the Riksdag from the Sweden Democrats
Swedish people of Finnish descent
Swedish male musicians
Synth-pop musicians
Members of the Riksdag 2010–2014
Members of the Riksdag 2014–2018
Members of the Riksdag 2018–2022
Members of the Riksdag 2022–2026
21st-century Swedish politicians